Cross Club is a music venue located in the Holešovice district of Prague, Czech Republic.

History 
Cross Club was founded by a group of friends in 2002. Originally a small club, which has expanded over the years into a three-floor venue.
Cross Club showcases various music performances, cultural events and exhibitions. 
There's a daytime cafe and a restaurant on the premises.

Cross Club area 

Both interior and exterior are designed in steam-punk futuristic style and since the beginning have been created mainly from trash metal and other waste material by Cross Club team DIY. 
The whole space keeps undergoing changes over time, currently with two indoor stages, multiple bars, cafe and restaurant, theater, rehearsal studios and an outdoor sitting area and stage.

Line-up 
Cross Club has hosted different acts from various music and culture fields, focusing mainly on unconventional scene and cultural diversity, favouring genres such as dub, dubstep, breakbeat, drum'n'bass, reggae, ska, punk rock, rockabilly, world music and experimental music.

Performers such as Camo & Krooked, EZ3kiel, Zion Train, Congo Natty, Dreadzone Soundsystem, Jah Shaka, Che Sudaka, Transglobal Underground, High Tone, Bambounou, Ragga Twins, The Stooges, Nanci and Phoebe, Joe Driscoll & Sekou Kouyate, Dom & Roland, Vibronics, Creepshow, Koffin Kats, The Bush Chemists, Rashad & Dj Spinn and many more have appeared at Cross Club in recent years.

Presentations, discussions, screenings and authors' readings also regularly take place at the venue, focusing mainly on social topics.

See also 
In 2014, Cross Club was listed as one of 25 best venues in Europe according to the Guardian newspaper article.

References 

2002 establishments in the Czech Republic
Music venues in Prague
Music venues completed in 2002
21st-century architecture in the Czech Republic